Tersky (masculine), Terskaya (feminine), or Terskoye (neuter) may refer to:

Tersky District, the name of several districts in Russia
Tersky (rural locality) (Terskaya, Terskoye), the name of several rural localities in Russia

See also
 Tersk (disambiguation)
 Terek (disambiguation)